The sea beet, Beta vulgaris subsp. maritima ((L.) Arcangeli.), is a member of the family Amaranthaceae, previously of the Chenopodiaceae. Carl Linnaeus first described Beta vulgaris in 1753; in the second edition of Species Plantarum in 1762, he divided the species into wild and cultivated varieties, giving the name Beta maritima to the wild taxon. The sea beet is native to the coasts of Europe, northern Africa, and southern Asia.

The sea beet is the wild ancestor of common vegetables such as beetroot, sugar beet, and Swiss chard. Its leaves have a pleasant texture and taste, being good served raw or cooked, and because of this, it is also known as wild spinach. Its flowers are hermaphroditic, and wind-pollinated. It requires moist, well-drained soils, and does not tolerate shade. However, it is able to tolerate relatively high levels of sodium in its environment.

Description
The lower leaves are wavy and roughly triangular while the upper leaves are narrow and oval. The inflorescence is borne on a thick, fleshy grooved stem in a leafy spike. The individual flowers are green and tiny with the sepals thickening and hardening around the fruits.

Distribution and habitat
Sea beet is found in maritime locations in Europe, northern Africa, and southern Asia. In the British Isles it is found round the coasts of England, Wales, Ireland and southern Scotland. It grows at the top of sand and pebble beaches, at the drift-line on saltmarshes, on sea-walls, coastal rocks and cliffs. It also occurs on wasteland near the sea, and occasionally on rubbish tips and roadsides inland. On the pebble banks of Chesil Beach in Dorset, it dominates the drift-line along with oraches Atriplex spp., and is in dynamic equilibrium with a community dominated by shrubby sea-blite Suaeda vera.

References

Leaf vegetables
Beta (plant)
Plant subspecies